Hui Jiakang (born August 31, 1989 in Shenyang) is a Chinese professional footballer who currently plays for Chinese Super League club Changchun Yatai.

Club career
Hui Jiakang started his football career after graduating from the Shenzhen youth team in 2008. He quickly established himself within the Senior Shenzhen Xiangxue team after he made his debut against Shandong Luneng in a 2-1 defeat on July 5, in the 2008 Chinese Super League season. At the end of the season, Hui Jiakang played thirteen league games and his club wanted to offer him a new long term-contract, however, he was dropped from the team after there was a dispute about pay with his new contract at the beginning of the 2009 football league season. Shenzhen held him to his remaining contract while the Chinese Football Association stipulated that Hui Jiakang is still contractually obliged to Shenzhen and cannot transfer unless it is to a foreign team.

Without any football for a whole season, he went off to train with Hungarian side Ferencvárosi TC until Chinese second-tier side Chengdu Blades took him at the beginning of the 2010 league season where he made his debut against Nanjing Yoyo on April 4, 2010 in a 3-0 victory. Throughout the season he would then play in fourteen league games as he aided the club to a runners-up spot within the division and promotion back into the top tier. The following season would see Hui back into the top tier where despite being a regular within the team he could not prevent the team finishing within the relegation zone at the end of the 2011 Chinese Super League season.

International career
Hui Jiankang graduated through the Chinese U-20 team that took part in the AFC Youth Championship in 2008, where he played in 3 matches and scored 1 goal. Hui Jiakang would then graduate to senior side and made his debut in a 2008 friendly against Iran in a 2–0 loss coming on as a substitute. He made his second appearance for China nine years later on 10 January 2017 in the 2017 China Cup against Iceland.

Career statistics
Statistics accurate as of match played 31 December 2020.

References

External links
2008 Shenzhen squad at footballsquads.co.uk
Player stats at sohu.com

1989 births
Living people
Footballers from Shenyang
Chinese footballers
China international footballers
Shenzhen F.C. players
Chengdu Tiancheng F.C. players
Tianjin Jinmen Tiger F.C. players
Chinese Super League players
China League One players
Association football midfielders
Association football forwards